The 2014 European Modern Pentathlon Championships were held in Székesfehérvár, Hungary from July 10 to 15, 2014.

Medal summary

Men's events

Women's events

Mixed events

Medal table

References

External links
 Results

European Modern Pentathlon Championships
European Modern Pentathlon Championships
European Modern Pentathlon Championships
International sports competitions hosted by Hungary
Sport in Székesfehérvár
July 2014 sports events in Europe